Mariano Benlliure y Gil (8 September 18629 November 1947) was a Spanish sculptor and medallist, who executed many public monuments and religious sculptures in Spain, working in a heroic realist style.

Life and works
He was born in the Lower Street of the Carmen neighborhood of Valencia. His earliest sculptures featured bullfighting themes, modeled in wax and cast in bronze. At the age of thirteen he showed a wax modello of a picador at the Exposición Nacional de Bellas Artes, 1876. Pursuing the thought of becoming a painter, he went to Paris his expenses paid by his master, Francisco Domingo Marqués. A trip to Rome in 1879, revealing at first hand the sculptures of Michelangelo convinced him to be a sculptor. In 1887 he established himself permanently in Madrid, where in that year's Exposición Nacional his portrait sculpture of the painter Ribera won him a first-prize.

Benlliure's style is characterized by detailed naturalism allied to an impressionistic spontaneity. His portrait busts and public monuments are numerous, and include:

 the tomb of Práxedes Mateo Sagasta in the Pantheon of Illustrious Men, Madrid
 monument to José de San Martín, Lima, Peru
 the monument to Álvaro de Bazán, Plaza de la Villa, Madrid.
 the monument to Isabella the Catholic, Granada
 the monument to General Cassola, Parque del Oeste, Madrid
 the monument to Maria Christina of Bourbon, Madrid
 the bronze equestrian statue of the monument to Alfonso XII, in Madrid's El Retiro, the centerpiece of a memorial designed by architect José Grases Riera.
 the monument to Agustina de Aragón, in Zaragoza.
 the monument to Castelar, in Madrid.
 the monument to Arsenio Martínez Campos, in El Retiro.
 the monument to Miguel Primo de Rivera, in Jerez de la Frontera.
 the monument to Antonio Maura, in Palma de Mallorca.
 the monument to Cuba, in El Retiro, with help from Miquel Blay, Francisco Asorey and Juan Cristóbal (completed by 1930, unveiled in 1952).

Mariano Benlliure was the engraver of the first Peseta coins issued in 1947 showing the head of Franco.

He was depicted on the Spanish 500 ptas banknote in the 1950s, with his sculpture "Sepulcro De Gayarre en el Roncal" on the reverse.

Works

References

1862 births
1947 deaths
19th-century Spanish sculptors
19th-century Spanish male artists
Spanish male sculptors
20th-century Spanish sculptors
20th-century Spanish male artists
Orientalist painters
People from Valencia